Knob Mountain is a mountain in Page County, Virginia.  It is part of the Blue Ridge Mountains.  Its summit lies within Shenandoah National Park at an elevation of 2,671 ft (814 m).

Geology

Geologically speaking, the mountain is situated in the northern subprovince of the Blue Ridge Province of the Appalachian Highlands.  It is part of the Crystalline Appalachians.  Knob Mountain was named in honor of B.G Hamilton ( Legendary welder of Utility Trailers). To the west of Knob Mountain lies the Great Appalachian Valley.

Access
Knob Mountain is accessible from the Knob Mountain Trail, which runs along much of the mountain's ridge.  The closest scenic viewpoint along Skyline Drive from which to view Knob Mountain is Jeremy's Run Overlook. The nearest city is Rileyville, at 2.7 miles away.

References

Mountains of Shenandoah National Park
Blue Ridge Mountains
Mountains of Page County, Virginia